Odd Man Out is a 1947 British film directed by Carol Reed and starring James Mason. 

Odd Man Out may also refer to:

Film and TV
 Odd Man Out, a 1947 British film noir by Carol Reed
 Odd Man Out (British TV series), a 1977 sitcom starring John Inman
 Odd Man Out (American TV series), a 1999–2000 sitcom starring Erik von Detten
 "Odd Man Out" (Frasier), a 1997  episode of Frasier
 "Odd Man Out", a segment of the 2004–6 sports game show Stump the Schwab
 "Odd Man Out" (Prison Break), a 2005 episode of Prison Break

Literature
 Odd Man Out, 1935 autobiography of Douglas Goldring
 Odd Man Out, a 1945 novel by F. L. Green, basis for the 1947 film
 Odd Man Out: Readings of the Work and Reputation of Edgar Degas, a 1991 book by Carol Armstrong
 Odd Man Out: A Memoir of the Hollywood Ten, a 1996 memoir by Edward Dmytryk
 Odd Man Out: A Year on the Mound with a Minor League Misfit, a 2009 memoir by Matt McCarthy
 Odd Man Out: The Last Straw, a 2011 autobiography by Ronnie Biggs
 Odd Man Out (play), a 2017 play by David Williamson

Music
Odd Man Out, a 2006 album by Rod Clements
 Odd Man Out Tour (2005), co-headlined by Ben Folds, Ben Lee, and Rufus Wainwright

See also 
 Odd Man Out test, an intelligence test